This is a list of French television related events from 1982.

Events

Debuts

Mardi Cinéma

Television shows

1940s
Le Jour du Seigneur (1949–present)

1950s

Présence protestante (1955-)

1960s
Les Dossiers de l'écran (1967-1991)
Les Animaux du monde (1969-1990)
Alain Decaux raconte (1969-1987)

1970s
30 millions d'amis (1976-2016)
Les Jeux de 20 Heures (1976-1987)

1980s
Dimanche Martin
Julien Fontanes, magistrat (1980-1989)

Ending this year
Aujourd'hui Madame (1970-1982)
1, rue Sésame (1978-1982)

Births
3 February - Laurent Maistret, model & television presenter
25 April - Karine Ferri, TV personality & model

Deaths

See also
1982 in France
List of French films of 1982